Kerrin Leoni is a New Zealand politician who is an Auckland Councillor. In 2022, Leoni was elected as the Whau ward councillor.

Early life
Leoni is of Māori (Ngāti Pāoa, Ngāi Takoto, and Ngāti Kurī) and European (Italian and Irish) descent. Leoni spent 10 years of her life living in London, where she ran a contracting business and was a member of the cultural group Ngāti Rānana. She returned to New Zealand in the mid-2010s.

Political career

Leoni was elected to the Waitematā Local Board in 2019 on the City Vision ticket. She served as deputy chair for the first half of the term. Despite a strong pro-Labour swing, Leoni lost to the incumbent National MP Tim van de Molen. Her list placement of 66th was not high enough to enter parliament.

In the 2022 local body elections, Leoni was elected as a councillor for the Whau ward, after narrowly winning the election from the incumbent councillor Tracy Mulholland. Leoni is the first female Māori councillor to be elected to the Auckland Council.

References

21st-century New Zealand women politicians
Alumni of King's College London
Auckland Councillors
Living people
New Zealand Labour Party politicians
New Zealand Māori women
New Zealand people of Italian descent
New Zealand people of Irish descent
Ngāi Takoto people
Ngāti Pāoa people
Ngāti Kurī people
Unsuccessful candidates in the 2020 New Zealand general election
Year of birth missing (living people)